Otocelididae is a family of acoels.

Taxonomy

Genera
There are five genera in the family Otocelididae:

 Archocelis Dörjes, 1968
 Exocelis Ehlers & Dörjes, 1979
 Haplotestis Dörjes, 1968
 Philocelis Dörjes, 1968
 Posticopora  Kozloff, 2000

Species
The following species are recognised in the family Otocelididae.

Notes

References

Acoelomorphs